Stroboscopic may refer to:

 Stroboscopic effect, visual temporal aliasing
Stroboscopic effect (lighting), a temporal light artefact visible if a moving object is lit with modulated light with specific modulation frequencies and amplitudes
 Stroboscope, any of various stroboscopic devices
 Strobe light, high-intensity and short-duration stroboscopic device